The Gateway/Northeast 99th Avenue Transit Center, commonly known as Gateway Transit Center, is a TriMet bus transit center and light rail station on the MAX Blue, Green and Red Lines in Portland, Oregon, United States. It is the 14th stop eastbound on the current Eastside MAX. This station is where all three lines split, with Blue Line trains proceeding east to Gresham, Green Line trains proceeding south to Clackamas, and Red Line trains proceeding north to Portland International Airport.  When opened in 1986, it was the busiest station on the Portland–Gresham MAX line, the only line in the system at that time, and was the terminus of 11 bus lines. Currently seven bus lines serve the Gateway Transit Center.

The transit center is next to the interchange of Interstate 84 and Interstate 205, and behind a Fred Meyer store  in the Gateway Shopping Center.  Neighborhoods served by this station include Hazelwood, Woodland Park, Parkrose Heights, Madison South and Montavilla.

Platform layout

The transit center includes three light rail tracks and platforms, with bus stops located on the east side of the station. The easternmost track is used by inbound (westbound) Blue and Green Line trains. Trains on this track open up doors to both the side and center platforms.  The middle track is to the west of the center platform and is used by inbound Red Line trains. The westernmost track has a side platform and is used by all outbound (eastbound) trains.

Inbound Red Line trains use the center track but inbound Blue and Green Line trains use the inbound main line track because of the way the Red Line junction is configured. Because the tracks going into Gateway eastbound approach from the north, running the Red Line north to the airport from Gateway would have required the operator to change cabs. To rectify the problem, TriMet created a special configuration to the Red Line junction. Inbound, the double track line becomes a single track route about 1/2 mile north of Gateway. The track runs adjacent to I-205, crosses under the main line, then swings around north on a tight horseshoe turn, and merges with the outbound track just south of Gateway. Inbound trains then use the center track switches to cross over to the inbound track. Future construction is proposed to reconfigure the junction and build separate platforms so that Red Line trains can travel straight north from Gateway without traveling through the loop.

In comparison, the Green Line's junction with the Blue Line, 1/2 mile south of Gateway, is configured as a standard diverging junction.

Parking at this station and transit center was originally entirely in the form of surface lots, but in June 2006 TriMet opened a new 690-space parking garage. This compensated for the closure of the surface lot closest to the station, which was replaced by a medical building. A surface lot to the south of the station, in place since the station's opening in 1986, was not affected.

Bus service

This station in the Gateway District is served by the following bus lines:
15 – Belmont/NW 23rd
19 – Woodstock/Glisan
22 – Parkrose
23 – San Rafael
24 – Fremont/NW 18th
25 – Glisan/Rockwood
87 – Airport Way/181st
Columbia Gorge Express (intercity service to Multnomah Falls, Cascade Locks, and Hood River)

Unique station features 
The station has the following features:
Feathers: Designed by Frank Boyden, they consist of three 14–18 feet long painted aluminum feathers that work as windvanes on 20 feet poles.
Blackberry frosted glass: The windscreens at this station (and many others) have a frosted/etched pattern of the pervasive blackberry in Oregon.

See also
 List of TriMet transit centers

References

External links

Gateway/NE 99th Ave. Transit Center – TriMet page

MAX Light Rail stations
MAX Blue Line
MAX Red Line
MAX Green Line
TriMet transit centers
Railway stations in the United States opened in 1986
1986 establishments in Oregon
Railway stations in Portland, Oregon
Bus stations in Portland, Oregon